Loryma actenioides is a species of snout moth in the genus Loryma. It was described by Rebel in 1914, and is known from Algeria, the Sahara desert, and Egypt.

References

Moths described in 1914
Pyralini
Moths of Africa